Youness Baalla (born 25 April 1999) is a Moroccan boxer. He competed in the men's heavyweight event at the 2020 Summer Olympics.

Career
Baalla won the silver medal at the 2019 All-African Games in Rabat in the heavyweight category. He qualified for the Tokyo Olympics via the African Olympic Qualification Tournament in Dakar in March 2020.

Baalla was disqualified from the 2020 Summer Olympics in Tokyo after trying to bite his opponent's (David Nyika) ear in round 16 of the -91 kg event.

References

External links
 
 
 
 

1999 births
Living people
Moroccan male boxers
Olympic boxers of Morocco
Boxers at the 2020 Summer Olympics
Sportspeople from Casablanca
African Games medalists in boxing
20th-century Moroccan people
21st-century Moroccan people
African Games silver medalists for Morocco
Competitors at the 2019 African Games